Afimico Pululu (born 23 March 1999) is an Angolan professional footballer who plays as a forward for Greuther Fürth.

Club career
Pululu started his youth football with local club A.S. Coteaux Mulhouse. In the summer of 2013, he moved to Basel's youth academy and advanced through all stages until in 2015 he reached their U-21 team, who played in the third tier of Swiss football. In May 2017 Pululu signed a four-year contract and advanced to Basel's first team under head coach Urs Fischer. After playing in three test games Pululu played his domestic league debut for the club in the home game in the St. Jakob-Park on 20 August 2017 as Basel played a 1–1 draw with Lugano.

On 29 January 2019 Basel announced that Pululu was transferred to Xamax on loan until the end of the season. He debuted for Xamax in the match against Young Boys on 2 February. He scored two goals for Xamax in the match against Sion on 9 March.

He returned to Basel for their 2019–20 season under head coach Marcel Koller and signed an extended contract until summer 2022. In the team's first test match that season Pululu was substituted in at half time and scored a hat-trick and helped the team win 4–2 against SC Kriens after being two goals down at the break. He scored his first domestic league goal for his club on 8 December in the home game as Basel won 1–0 against Sion. In this season Pululu had 29 appearances, however always as substitute. To gain match practice he played in the U-21 team. Therefore, the club looked for a new solution and the player left the club on a free transfer.

Between the years 2017 and 2022 Pululu played a total of 115 games for Basel's first team scoring a total of 13 goals. 59 of these games were in the Swiss Super League, eight in the Swiss Cup, 6 in the UEFA competitions (Champions, Europa and Conference League) and 32 were friendly games. He scored four goal in the domestic league, one in the cup and the other eight were scored during the test games.

On 7 January 2022 Basel announced that Pululu would move to Bundesliga side Greuther Fürth. Greuther Fürth confirmed the transfer on the same day and stated that the players had signed on a two-and-a-half year deal.

Honours
Basel
 Swiss Cup: 2018–19

References

External links
 
 

1999 births
Living people
Footballers from Luanda
Angolan footballers
French people of Angolan descent
French footballers
Association football forwards
FC Basel players
Neuchâtel Xamax FCS players
SpVgg Greuther Fürth players
Swiss Super League players
Bundesliga players
French expatriate footballers
Angolan expatriate footballers
Expatriate footballers in Switzerland
French expatriate sportspeople in Switzerland
Angolan expatriate sportspeople in Switzerland
Expatriate footballers in Germany
French expatriate sportspeople in Germany
Angolan expatriate sportspeople in Germany